Erdal Kılıçaslan (born 23 August 1984) is a Turkish-German former professional footballer who played as a forward. With 41 goals in 64 caps across all Germany youth levels, he holds the record for German youth internationals.

Career
Kılıçaslan came through youth setup at Bayern Munich. During this time he represented Germany at Under-15 to Under-20 level, scoring 41 goals in 64 caps overall. As of December 2017, this was a record for any German youth international. He progressed to Bayern's reserve team in the Regionalliga, but left after two years, heading to Turkey in 2005. After three years with Gaziantepspor, he moved to Konyaspor in 2008 and joined Gençlerbirliği in 2011.

Kılıçaslan was released by Osmanlispor in summer 2017.

References

External links
 
 
 

1984 births
Living people
German footballers
Germany youth international footballers
Turkish footballers
German people of Turkish descent
Footballers from Munich
Association football forwards
FC Bayern Munich II players
Gaziantepspor footballers
Gaziantep F.K. footballers
Konyaspor footballers
Gençlerbirliği S.K. footballers
Mersin İdman Yurdu footballers
Ankaraspor footballers
Süper Lig players
Türkgücü München players